James Philip Toohey  (11 July 1909 – 18 August 1992) was an Australian politician. Born in Adelaide, South Australia, he was educated at state schools before becoming a car worker. After serving as assistant secretary of the Vehicle Builders' Employees Union, he was secretary of the South Australian Labor Party 1947–1955, and a member of its Federal Executive 1948–1959. He also sat on West Torrens Council. In 1953, he was elected to the Australian Senate as a Labor Senator for South Australia. He held the seat until his retirement in 1970.

Toohey died in 1992, aged 83.

References

1909 births
1992 deaths
Australian Labor Party members of the Parliament of Australia
Members of the Australian Senate for South Australia
Members of the Australian Senate
Members of the Order of Australia
20th-century Australian politicians